Javier Pereira may refer to:

 Javier Pereira (supercentenarian), Zenú Indian from Colombia
 Javier Pereira (actor), Spanish actor